Saravan Airport  is an airport serving Saravan in Iran.

References

Airports in Iran
Buildings and structures in Sistan and Baluchestan Province
Transportation in Sistan and Baluchestan Province